Obrežje is a settlement in the Municipality of Radeče in central Slovenia. It lies on the left bank of the Sava River and is thus part of the traditional region of Lower Styria, rather than Lower Carniola, where the rest of the municipality on the opposite bank of the river belongs. The entire municipality is now included in the Lower Sava Statistical Region; until January 2014 it was part of the Savinja Statistical Region.

Mass grave
Obrežje is the site of a mass grave associated with the Second World War. The Bunker Mass Grave is located in a concrete-sealed bunker on a slope above the house at Obrežje no. 60. It contains the remains of an unknown number of Montenegrin Chetnik soldiers.

References

External links

Obrežje at Geopedia

Populated places in the Municipality of Radeče